is a Japanese professional football manager and former player, who manages J1 League club Kashima Antlers. He also played for the Japan national team.

Club career
Iwamasa was born in Suo-Oshima, Yamaguchi on 30 January 1982. He was educated at and played for Iwakuni High School and Tokyo Gakugei University before turning professional. He started his professional career at Kashima Antlers where he later became one of the club's longest serving players. He became a regular player at center back from late first season. The club won the champions in J1 League for three years in a row (2007–2009) first time in J1 League history. He was also elected Best XI for three years in a row. The club also won 2007, 2010 Emperor's Cup, 2011 and 2012 J.League Cup. His opportunity to play decreased in 2013 and he left the club end of 2013 season.

In 2014, he moved to BEC Tero Sasana, Thailand, and helped the club win 2014 Thai League Cup in which he scored a goal in the final match. In 2015, he returned to Japan, playing for Fagiano Okayama. In 2017, he moved to Regional Leagues club Tokyo United FC. He retired at the end of the 2018 season.

International career
Iwamasa was the captain of the Japan team that won the 2003 Summer Universiade held in Daegu, South Korea, where he scored a goal in the final of the tournament. He received the first call-up for Japan national team in 2008 by newly appointed coach Takeshi Okada. On 10 October 2009, he made his international debut in a friendly match against Scotland. He was also one of the final 23 Japan national football players participating in 2010 FIFA World Cup although did not play any minute during the tournament. After 2010 World Cup, in January 2011, he was selected Japan for 2011 AFC Asian Cup by new manager Alberto Zaccheroni. At 2011 Asian Cup, he played in four matches and Japan won the champions. He played eight games for Japan until 2011.

Managerial career
Iwamasa's first managerial appointment was in 2017 as player-coach for Tokyo United FC. After retiring as a player in 2018, in 2021 he became manager of Jobu University's football team. For the 2022 season, Iwamasa became the assistant manager of Kashima Antlers and took charge of a number of games whilst new manager René Weiler awaited entry to the country due to COVID-19 quarantine restrictions. In August 2022, it was announced that Iwamasa would be promoted to manager of Kashima Antlers following the departure of Weiler.

Career statistics

Club

International

Honours
Kashima Antlers
J1 League: 2007, 2008, 2009
Emperor's Cup: 2007, 2010
J.League Cup: 2011, 2012
Japanese Super Cup: 2009, 2010

BEC Tero Sasana
Thai League Cup: 2014

Japan
 AFC Asian Cup: 2011

Individual
J.League Best XI: 2007, 2008, 2009

References

External links
 
 
 Japan National Football Team Database
 

1982 births
Living people
Tokyo Gakugei University alumni
Association football people from Yamaguchi Prefecture
Japanese footballers
Association football defenders
Japan international footballers
Universiade gold medalists for Japan
Universiade medalists in football
2010 FIFA World Cup players
2011 AFC Asian Cup players
J1 League players
J2 League players
Daiki Iwamasa
Kashima Antlers players
Daiki Iwamasa
Fagiano Okayama players
Japanese expatriate footballers
Japanese expatriate sportspeople in Thailand
Expatriate footballers in Thailand
J1 League managers
Kashima Antlers managers
Tokyo United FC players